The Paseo de la Guerra is a complex of historic buildings in downtown Santa Barbara, California. Since 1977 it is listed (as El Paseo and Casa de la Guerra) in National Register of Historic Places. It is named for the Guerra family of California, a historically prominent Californio family in Santa Barbara.

It includes the Spanish Colonial architecture adobe Casa de la Guerra, the restored historic home of a Spanish Military Officer, Civil Servant, and Californio rancher José de la Guerra y Noriega on which construction begun in the 18th century.

Paseo de la Guerra became an artisan and shops arcade integrating the adobe in the mid-20th century, with Spanish Colonial Revival architecture by renowned local architect Lutah Maria Riggs, the associate of George Washington Smith.

Paseo de la Guerra continues as a major landmark and attraction, as a museum and boutique mall.

See also 
Guerra family of California
Casa de la Guerra
José de la Guerra y Noriega
Pablo de la Guerra
Antonio Maria de la Guerra
Alfred Robinson - Anita de la Guerra de Noriega y Carrillo
History of Santa Barbara, California
Rancho Los Alamos

References

Buildings and structures in Santa Barbara, California
de la Guerra
National Register of Historic Places in Santa Barbara County, California
de la Guerra
Spanish Colonial Revival architecture in California